The 1968 Kentucky Derby was the 94th running of the Kentucky Derby. The race took place on May 4, 1968.

The race was the first Kentucky Derby in which the winning horse was subsequently disqualified. Dancer's Image won the race, but was disqualified to last after traces of phenylbutazone were discovered in the mandatory post-race urinalysis. Second-place finisher Forward Pass was declared the winner. The controversy filled the sporting news of media outlets in North America and was a cover story for Sports Illustrated, which referred to it as "the year's major sports story."

Full results

 Winning Breeder: Calumet Farm; (KY)

Race Description 
Starting off out of the gates Dancers Image had a bad break out of the gate, leading the horse to fall behind very quickly being in last. Then Dancers Image started to make a comeback and getting all the way back to the front and by the 8th pole passed the favorite, Forward Pass, Leading Dancers image to victory. This was the 5th time a Horse had gone from last to first. This was short-lived as Dancers Image failed its urinalysis, this put Dancers Image back into last place. Runner-up Forward Pass was deemed the winner.

Notes

References

Further reading

External links
 1968 Kentucky Derby via YouTube

1968
Kentucky Derby
Derby
Kentucky
Kentucky Derby